Alaya Deepam is a 1984 Indian Tamil-language film directed by C. V. Sridhar and produced by K.R.Gangadharan. It stars Sujatha, Rajesh, Suresh and Ilavarasi. The film was remade in Telugu under the same title in 1985 with Sujatha and Ilavarasi reprising their roles.

Plot

Cast 
Sujatha
Rajesh
Suresh
Ilavarasi
Jaishankar
Vanitha
Manorama
Thengai Srinivasan
Y. G. Mahendran
V. Gopalakrishnan in Guest appearance
Typist Gopu

Soundtrack 
The soundtrack was composed by M. S. Viswanathan, with lyrics by Vaali.

References

External links 
 

1980s Tamil-language films
1984 films
Films directed by C. V. Sridhar
Films scored by M. S. Viswanathan
Tamil films remade in other languages